Serge Gendron, (born February 19, 1967), better known by the stage name Skip Jensen, is a Canadian singer-songwriter and cartoonist raised in Lachine, Montreal.

Career

Music
Jensen began his musical career in 1996 with the group Scat Rag Boosters, which was known for its special brand of rock 'n' roll garage music.
The group existed until 2004, releasing a dozen singles, a few songs on different compilations, and one official album. Jensen also played in Stack O'Lees and The Wrong Doers, and from 2004 until 2007 he played drums in Demon's Claws.

In 2000, Jensen began his solo career as a one-man band called Skip Jensen & His Shakin' Feet and released several singles on European labels. His first solo album, Abscond, was published in 2005. His second, The Spirit of the Ghost, came out in 2011. The album was mixed by Orson Presence, former member of The Monochrome Set.

He has toured in Canada, the United States, Europe, and China. His next album will be released in 2013, with Johann Schlager on drums and Shawn Cotton on bass.

Comics
Jensen started creating comics and illustrations around 2006. He contributed to the comic Justine in 2009. His first cartoon was published in Trip Number 7 in 2012. The comic tells the story of the 1972 Blue Bird Café fire in Montreal.

Jensen is currently working on an autobiographical graphic novel about his childhood in Lachine.

Discography

Solo
Albums
Abscond LP, Nitro, Belgium, 2005, NITRO 028
Abscond CD, Deltapop, USA, 2005, DPM 005
The Spirit Of The Ghost, Red Lounge Records, Germany, 2011

EPs
On The Right Side, Yakisakana Records, France, 2003, SAZAE 010
Evil Weirdos, Yakisakana Records, France, 2003, SAZAE 012
split/single, Solid Sex Lovie Doll Records, Italy, 2003, SSLD 011
Mountain, Deltapop, USA, 2004, DPM 002
Honey Child, Latida Records, Canada, 2006, LTDR 002
Out On The Horizon, Perpetrators Records, New Zealand, 2007, PERP 19
Alone & Forsaken, Goodbye Boozy Records, Italy, 2008, GB 39
All I want, Bug house Records, USA, 2008, BG-004
Lonesome Moon, GhostHighway Recordings, Spain, 2010
Building Down/Evil Weirdos, Stencil Trash Records, Germany, 2014

Compilation appearances
Attack of the One Man, Bands compilation, Rocknroll Purgatory, USA, 2007, RRP 020
Compilation du Salon, Musique Indépendante, Montréal, SMIM Records 2007, Canada

With Scat Rag Boosters
Albums
Scat Rag Boosters LP, Yakisakana Records, France, 2004, KUJIRA 001
Scat Rag Boosters CD, Deltapop, USA, 2005, DPM 004

EPs
Slickat, Flying bomb Records, USA, 2000, FLB-113
split/single, Goodbye Boozy Records, Italy, 2000, GB 06
The Violent Climax, Arse’Plot Recordings, France, 2000, SMG 001
I'm Coming On, Yakisakana Records, France, 2001, SAZAE 004
I Mean It, Goodbye Boozy Records, Italy, 2002, GB 09
Sidetracked, Zaxxon Records, Canada, 2002, ZVA 5
Boogie Man, Kryptonite Records, USA, 2003, KR-008; Savage Records, Sweden 2003, SAV 7006
Leavin' Town, Solid Sex Lovie Doll Records, Italy, 2003, SSLD 010
Charlie's Dirtroad, Goodbye Boozy Records, Italy, 2004, GB 16

Compilation appearances
Nothing Beats A Royal Flush, Roto-Flex Records, Canada, 1997
Blow The Fuse Pot-Pourri De Quality, Blow The Fuse Records, Canada, 1997, BTFCD 002
A Harem Of Hits CD, Sultan Records, Canada, 1999, SLTN CD 001
Greaseball Melodrama, Gearhead Records, États-Unis 2003, RPM 047
The Sympathetic Sounds Of Montréal CD, Sympathy for the Record Industry, USA, 2005, SFTRI 686

With Stack O'Lees
EPs
Change My Plan, Big Black Hole Records, Spain, 2004, Hole 002

Compilation appearances
The Sympathetic Sounds Of Montréal CD, Sympathy for the Record Industry, USA, 2005, SFTRI 686

With Demon's Claws
Albums
Demon's Claws LP, P-Trash Records, Germany, 2005, FULL TRASH 003
Demon's Claws CD, Dead Canary Records, USA, 2005, DCR 004
Satan's Little Pet Pig, In The Red Records, USA, 2007, ITR 139

EPs
Demon's Claws, P-Trash Records, Germany, 2005, P.TRASH 09
Tomcat, Perpetrators Records, New Zealand, 2005, PERP 6

Compilation appearances
Gravy Presents Get it! Smash it! Vol 1, USA
Lost In The Desert, Demos and Outtakes, Telephone Explosion, Canada, 2009, TER010

Comics and illustrations
Lachine Beach, Éditions Trip, Montréal, 2015
Lachine Beach, Magazine Trip no8, Éditions Trip, Montréal, 2014
Blue Bird, Magazine Trip No7, Éditions Trip, Montréal, 2012
Out On The Horizon, Perpetrators Records, Nouvelle-Zélande, 2007, PERP 19
Justine, Iris, La Pastèque, Montréal, 2011
The Spirit Of The Ghost, Red Lounge Records, Germany, 2011

References

External links
Demons Claws at Punks Make Your Day
Skip Jensen at Bandcamp
Skip Jensen at SoundCloud
Skip Jensen at Sonic Dirt

Comics/Illustrations
Skip Jensen Comics
Skip Jensen Illustrations

1967 births
Canadian male singers
Canadian singer-songwriters
Singers from Montreal
Living people
People from Lachine, Quebec
Canadian male singer-songwriters